Microlunatus lacustris is a species of Gram-positive, non-motile and aerobic bacteria.

References

Further reading

External links 
LPSN

Type strain of Friedmanniella lacustris at BacDive -  the Bacterial Diversity Metadatabase

Propionibacteriales
Bacteria described in 2000